Out of Life is a 1991 film directed by Lebanese director Maroun Bagdadi. The film tells the story of a French photographer (played by Hippolyte Girardot), who is kidnapped in Beirut, Lebanon, and attempts to maintain his personal dignity in the face of torture and brainwashing. The story was inspired by the events surrounding the kidnapping of Roger Auque during the Lebanon hostage crisis. The film was produced by the French companies Galatée Films and Films A2.

Cast
 Hippolyte Girardot - Patrick Perrault
 Rafic Ali Ahmad - Walid 'Chief'
 Hussein Sbeity - Omar
 Habib Hammoud - Ali 'Philippe'
 Majdi Machmouchi - Moustapha
 Hassan Farhat - Ahmed 'Frankenstein'
 Hassan Zbib - Fadi
 Nabila Zeitouni - Najat
 Hamza Nasrallah - 'De Niro'
 Sami Hawat - Hassan
 Sabrina Leurquin - Isabelle
 Roger Assaf - Farid
 Nidal Al-Askhar - Khaled's Mother (as Nidal Ashkar)
 Fadi Abou Khalil - (as Fady Abou Khalil)

Awards
The film won the Jury Prize at the 1991 Cannes Film Festival.

References

External links 
 
 

1991 films
French war drama films
Films directed by Maroun Bagdadi
Films produced by Jacques Perrin
Lebanese Civil War films
Films scored by Nicola Piovani
1990s French films